David John Davidson (10 May 1875 – 3 November 1952) was an Australian rules footballer who played for Melbourne and South Melbourne in the Victorian Football League (VFL).

Originally from Albert Park, Davidson had just three seasons in the VFL but later returned as a boundary umpire. He officiated in 44 matches, most notably the 1905 Grand Final, as well as field umpiring a match in the 1906 season.

References
Holmesby, Russell and Main, Jim (2007). The Encyclopedia of AFL Footballers. 7th ed. Melbourne: Bas Publishing.

External links

1875 births
Australian rules footballers from Victoria (Australia)
Melbourne Football Club players
Sydney Swans players
Australian Football League umpires
1952 deaths